Vida Amaadi Yeboah (1944-2006) was a former Ghanaian educator, politician and civic leader. Deputy Minister of Education and Culture from 1988 to 1993, Yeboah helped found the Forum for African Women Educationalists (FAWE) in 1992.  Elected member of parliament in 1992, Yeboah became a member of Jerry Rawlings' government, serving as tourism minister from 1997 to 2001.

Early life and education
Vida Yeboah was born on 27 July 1944 at her maternal family village in the Eastern Region, the daughter of Kate Oye Ntow Ofosu and Eric Perigrino Nelson. She was educated at Wesley Girls High School before gaining her BA in French from the University of Ghana. She then studied for a MA in French from the University of Bordeaux in France, and a post-graduate diploma in education from the University of Cape Coast.

She taught for fourteen years at girls schools in Ghana, becoming headmistress of Mfantsiman Girls' Secondary School, before being appointed a Deputy Secretary for Education in 1985.

From 1988 to 1993 Vida Yeboah was Deputy Minister of Education and Culture. Yeboah overhauled the pre-university schooling system, increasing the attendance rates for girls. In 1992 she cofounded the Forum for African Women Educationalists with four other African women ministers of education: Fay Chung in Zimbabwe, Simone Testa in the Seychelles, Paulette Moussavon-Missambo in Gabon, and Alice Tiendrebengo in Burkina Faso.

Politics 

Vida was elected to represent Akuapim South  in the first parliament of the fourth republic of Ghana on 7 January 1993 after she was pronounced winner at the 1992 Ghanaian parliamentary election held on 29 December 1992.

She was re-elected into the second parliament of the fourth republic after obtaining 48% of the vote at the 1996 elections. She was appointed in 1997 as the Minister of Tourism where she served till 2001, a ministerial position outside the Cabinet.

Awards and recognition
Vida Yeboah is remembered as one of the four founders of Forum for African Women Educationalists (FAWE) Ghana's Chapter.

References

Sources
 Vida Amaadi Yeboah at the African People Database

1944 births
2006 deaths
Ghanaian MPs 1997–2001
Tourism ministers of Ghana
21st-century Ghanaian women politicians
20th-century Ghanaian women politicians
Women government ministers of Ghana
Women members of the Parliament of Ghana
University of Ghana alumni
University of Bordeaux alumni
University of Cape Coast alumni
People educated at Wesley Girls' Senior High School
Ghanaian educators
People from Eastern Region (Ghana)
Ghanaian MPs 1993–1997